Gora is a rural locality (a village) in Khokhlovskoye Rural Settlement, Permsky District, Perm Krai, Russia. The population was 11 as of 2010. There are eight streets.

Geography 
Gora is located 45 km north of Perm (the district's administrative centre) by road. Khokhlovka is the nearest rural locality.

References 

Rural localities in Permsky District